MV Viking Sea is a cruise ship built by Italian shipbuilders Fincantieri for Viking Ocean Cruises. It is the second ship to grace the name Viking Sea, the first being Viking Sky which was originally assigned this name. 

Viking Sea sailed from Venice to New Capital Quay on the River Thames at Greenwich, London, England, where on 5 May 2016 she became the largest vessel named in London. Viking Sea has  3 sister ships,  and Viking Sun.

Facilities
Viking Sea has passenger accommodations, three swimming pools, a spa, a fitness center, four restaurants and a café, lounges, a winter garden, a terrace, a sports deck, theatre and bars, and shops.

Accidents and Incidents 
August 2016 Viking Sea lost power in Malta

References

External links 

Official website
"The happiest cruise on the sea " – review by Brian Johnston on traveler.com.au (Fairfax Media)

Ships built in Ancona
Ships built in Venice
Ships built by Fincantieri
Cruise ships
2015 ships